Adam Payce (born 21 October 2004) is an English professional footballer who plays as a defender for  club Portsmouth.

Career
Payce made his first-team debut for Portsmouth on 9 November 2021, in a 3–0 win over Crystal Palace U21 in an EFL Trophy fixture at Fratton Park.

Style of play
Payce is a versatile and athletic player.

Career statistics

References

2004 births
Living people
English footballers
Association football defenders
Portsmouth F.C. players
English Football League players